Summit Lake is an unincorporated community and census-designated place (CDP) in Langlade County, Wisconsin, United States. Summit Lake has a post office with ZIP code 54485. As of the 2010 census its population was 144.

History
A post office called Summit Lake has been in operation since 1882. The community took its name from nearby Summit Lake.

References

Census-designated places in Langlade County, Wisconsin
Census-designated places in Wisconsin